Mohammad Mahfizur Rahman (born 15 May 1993) is a Bangladeshi swimmer. He competed in the 50m freestyle event at the 2012 and 2016 Summer Olympics, and was Team  Bangladesh national flag bearer at the 2012 Summer Olympics Parade of Nations.

Rahman has a degree in history from Jahangirnagar University. He is on active duty with the Bangladesh Navy.

He is one of the best Freestyle swimmer in Bangladesh.

References

External links
 

1993 births
Olympic swimmers of Bangladesh
Bangladeshi male swimmers
Swimmers at the 2012 Summer Olympics
Living people
Commonwealth Games competitors for Bangladesh
Swimmers at the 2014 Commonwealth Games
Swimmers at the 2010 Summer Youth Olympics
Swimmers at the 2016 Summer Olympics
Swimmers at the 2018 Asian Games
Asian Games competitors for Bangladesh
Jahangirnagar University alumni
South Asian Games silver medalists for Bangladesh
South Asian Games bronze medalists for Bangladesh
South Asian Games medalists in swimming